Chang Jin-fu (born 9 March 1948) is a Taiwanese politician. He was the Governor of Taiwan Province from 2009 to 2010.

Early life
Chang was born in Yingge Township, Taipei County in 1948. He received his bachelor's degree in electrical engineering from National Taiwan University (NTU) in 1970 and his doctoral degree in electrical engineering and computer science from the University of California, Berkeley in the United States in 1977.

Career
Upon graduation, Chang returned to Taiwan and spent most of his career in the academic world. He spent much of his early career time in teaching and research at the Department of Electrical Engineering of NTU, where he went through different positions and ranks from teaching assistant, instructor, associate professor to professor. He also served as the Chairman of the Department of Electrical Engineering of NTU for two years and Acting Dean of the Department of Engineering of NTU for two months.

He taught twice between 1982 and 1985 for 1.5 years at the Department of Electrical and Computer Engineering of the Naval Postgraduate School in Monterey, California, United States. He served as the Director of Science and Technology Advisory Office of the ROC Ministry of Education in July 1987 until June 1990. He became the Dean of Academic Affairs of National Central University in 1991–1994. He was appointed President  of National Chi Nan University, Taiwan, from 2000 to 2008. From 2012 to 2015, he served as President of Yuan Ze University, Taiwan. He was also the Board Chairman Chairman of Institute for Information Industry (III) of Taiwan's III - Institute for Information Industry.

Awards
He was elected to IEEE Fellow in 1994 for his technical contributions to wireless mobile communications.

References

1948 births
Chairpersons of the Taiwan Provincial Government
Living people
National Taiwan University alumni
UC Berkeley College of Engineering alumni
Fellow Members of the IEEE
Presidents of universities and colleges in Taiwan
Academic staff of Yuan Ze University
Government ministers of Taiwan
20th-century Taiwanese politicians
21st-century Taiwanese politicians